In the Democratic Socialist Republic of Sri Lanka, individuals are recognized for personal bravery, achievement, or service with the with national honours. The national honours consists of several types of award:

 National Honours are civil honours awarded for service to the nation, bravery, scientific achievement, achievements in arts, culture and drama. 
Decorations tend to be used to recognise specific deeds;
 Military decorations
Medals are used to recognise service on a particular operation or in a specific theatre, long or valuable service, and good conduct.
 Military medals
 Police medals

Awards are made by the President of Sri Lanka on behalf the Government of Sri Lanka, with the Presidential Secretariat being responsible for the administration of the honours.

History
Sinhalese monarchs rewarded their loyal subjects with titles and tokens of honor, with the last native kingdom, the Kingdom of Kandy having an established system of honors that had been in practice since time immemorial. The British established their own system of honors for the island, incorporating indigenous titles and Imperial honors by the late ninteeth century. Until 1972, the British honours system was in place in Ceylon along with several indigenous titles, however, since 1956 no nominations were made for these honours and were automatically discontinued after Sri Lanka became a republic.   
 
The modern national honours of Sri Lanka was constituted in 1986 when the National Honours Act of 1986 established a uniquely indigenous honours system of titles, decorations and medals which are awarded to recognise achievements of, or service by, Sri Lankans or others in connection with Sri Lanka. Several awards are titular.

Civil Honour
These include the following in the order of their ranking, which are used as titles;

For service to the nation

Sri Lankabhimanya
The Sri Lankabhimanya is conferred to " those who have rendered exceptionally outstanding and most distinguished service to the nation". The honour can only be held by five Sri Lankans contemporaneously, and also can be conferred posthumously.

Deshamanya
The Deshamanya (Pride of the Nation) is the second highest Sri Lankan national honour (after the Sri Lankabhimanya) awarded by the Government of Sri Lanka "for highly meritorious service".

Deshabandu
The Deshabandu is the third-highest Sri Lankan national honour. It is awarded "for meritorious service".

Sri Lanka Sikhamani
The Sri Lanka Sikhamani (Sri Lanka's precious gem) is a national honour "for service to the nation".

Sri Lanka Thilaka
The Sri Lanka Thilaka is a non titular national honour "for service to the nation".

For bravery

Veera Chudamani
The Veera Chudamani is a National Honour awarded " for acts of bravery of the highest order". Veera Chudamani ranks lower than Deshabandu.

Veera Prathapa
The Veera Prathapa is a non-titular national honour awarded " for acts of bravery of the highest order". Veera Prathapa ranks lower than Sri Lanka Thilaka.

For scientific achievement

Vidya Jyothi
The Vidya Jyothi is a national honour awarded " for outstanding scientific and technological achievements". It is the highest national honour for science in Sri Lanka for outstanding contribution to the development of the country through dedicated work in the chosen field. It is conventionally used as a title or prefix to the awardee's name. Vidya Jyothi ranks lower than Veera Chudamani.

Vidya Nidhi
The Vidya Nidhi is a national honour awarded " for meritorious scientific and technological achievements". Vidya Nidhi ranks lower than Sri Lanka Sikhamani.

For achievements in arts, culture and drama

Kala Keerthi
The Kala Keerthi is a national honour awarded " for extraordinary achievements and contributions in arts, culture and drama". It is the highest National Honour for arts, culture and drama in Sri Lanka. It is conventionally used as a title or prefix to the awardee's name. Kala Keerthi ranks lower than Vidya Jyothi

Kala Suri
The Kala Suri is a national honour awarded " for special contributions to the development of the arts". Kala Suri ranks lower than Vidya Nidhi.

For non-nationals

Sri Lanka Mitra Vibhushana
The Sri Lanka Mitra Vibhushana is the highest Sri Lankan honour for non-citizens, reserved for heads of state and heads of government with which Sri Lanka has friendly relations “in appreciation of their friendship towards and solidarity with the people of Sri Lanka”.

Sri Lanka Rathna
The Sri Lanka Rathna is a Sri Lankan honour, for foreigners or non-nationals, awarded " for exceptional and outstanding service to the nation". It comprises a citation and a gold medal studded with nine "navaratnas" (Sri Lankan gems) with a Manel symbol (the country's national flower).

Sri Lanka Ranjana
The Sri Lanka Ranjana is a Sri Lankan honour, for foreigners or non-nationals, awarded " for distinguished service of highly meritorious nature".

Sri Lanka Ramya
The Sri Lanka Ramya is a Sri Lankan honour, for foreigners or non-nationals, awarded "for distinguished service".

Order of precedence
 Sri Lankabhimanya
 Deshamanya
 Deshabandu
 Veera Chudamani
 Vidya Jyothi
 Kala Keerthi
 Sri Lanka Sikhamani
 Vidya Nidhi
 Kala Suri
 Sri Lanka Thilaka
 Veera Prathapa
 Sri Lanka Mitra Vibhushana
 Sri Lanka Rathna
 Sri Lanka Ranjana
 Sri Lanka Ramya

Non honours
 In the past, Justice of the Peace appointments were made as honours by the Minister of Justice. This entitle the holder to place post nominals JP after his or her name. 

 Religious and civil institutions in Sri Lanka commonly award various titles, however these are not recognised by the government and legislation is being drafted to stop such awards.

See also
 Military awards and decorations of Sri Lanka
 Awards and decorations of the Sri Lanka Police

References

 
Sri Lanka and the Commonwealth of Nations